Marcella Koek (born 27 May 1988) is a Dutch professional padel player and former professional tennis player.

Tennis career
In her tennis career, she won five singles and 23 doubles titles on the ITF Women's Circuit. Koek retired from professional tour in 2012.

Padel tennis career
Since 2015, she is a professional padel player and has her official padel instructor certificate, working as an instructor at Burger Dijk Tennis Club. Koek will participate in the Padel World Cup in Paraguay at the end of 2018. In 2018, Koek partnering Milou Ettekoven, claimed championship at the WebXperience NPB100 TPC Daalmeer tournament. Ettekoven/Koek confirmed their status as No. 1 ranked female padel team in Holland for the Nederlandse Padelbond ranking. 

In 2019, Koek and Ettekoven claimed championship at the Playtomic/Tibeflex Open FIP 250 in Gent, Belgium for the international padel circuit.

References

External links
 
 

1988 births
Living people
Dutch female tennis players
Female tennis players playing padel
21st-century Dutch women